Mervyn Fernandis (born 12 April 1959) is a former Indian hockey player. Mervyn played for the famous Indian Airlines hockey team in the 1970s. His name become synonymous with Indian hockey. He was a consistent performer for the Indian team. Mervyn with his body-serve and excellent finish was an exceptional forward. He was part of the Indian hockey team that won the gold medal in 1980 Summer Olympics at Moscow. His father, Mr Joe Fernandes was the coach in P.M.M Inner wheel school (Ambernath)for a very long period of time before retiring few years ago due to old age.

References

External links
 

Living people
Goan people
Field hockey players from Maharashtra
Olympic field hockey players of India
Olympic gold medalists for India
Field hockey players at the 1980 Summer Olympics
Field hockey players at the 1984 Summer Olympics
Field hockey players at the 1988 Summer Olympics
Recipients of the Arjuna Award
Olympic medalists in field hockey
People from Ambarnath
Indian male field hockey players
Medalists at the 1980 Summer Olympics
1959 births
Asian Games medalists in field hockey
Field hockey players at the 1978 Asian Games
Field hockey players at the 1982 Asian Games
Asian Games silver medalists for India
Medalists at the 1978 Asian Games
Medalists at the 1982 Asian Games